The Jamestown Windmill is a smock mill in Jamestown, Rhode Island within the Windmill Hill Historic District on North Road north of Weeden Lane.

It operated until 1896. Several renovations were done in the 20th century, and it is maintained by the Jamestown Historical Society. It was added to the National Register of Historic Places in 1973.

Images

See also
National Register of Historic Places listings in Newport County, Rhode Island

References and external links
Jamestown tourism information - including hours of the mill
"Historic and Architectural Resources of Jamestown, Rhode Island," (Rhode Island Historical Preservation & Heritage Commission)

Agricultural buildings and structures on the National Register of Historic Places in Rhode Island
Industrial buildings completed in 1787
Smock mills in the United States
Museums in Newport County, Rhode Island
Mill museums in the United States
Agricultural buildings and structures on the National Register of Historic Places
Buildings and structures in Jamestown, Rhode Island
Octagonal buildings in the United States
1787 establishments in Rhode Island
Windmills in Rhode Island
National Register of Historic Places in Newport County, Rhode Island
Historic district contributing properties in Rhode Island
Windmills on the National Register of Historic Places